Bram Kool (10 June 1937 – 11 June 1990) was a Dutch racing cyclist. He rode in the 1959 Tour de France.

References

External links
 

1937 births
1990 deaths
Dutch male cyclists
Place of birth missing
20th-century Dutch people